Sister, Sister is a 1982 American drama television movie written by Maya Angelou and starring Diahann Carroll, Rosalind Cash, and Irene Cara. The film tells the story of three sisters who come together to decide the fate of their family home after the death of their revered father. Originally filmed in February 1979, the film was shelved for three years before debuting on June 7, 1982, on NBC.

Plot
The story starts out in a small North Carolina town with Carolyne Lovejoy (Carroll), a schoolteacher, singing in the choir at her church. It is later revealed that she is having an intense affair with the church's married pastor, Rev. Henderson (Dick Anthony Williams), who is also the state's senator-elect. Carolyne later comes home from church to find her younger, 20-year-old sister Sissy (Cara), who Carolyne raised after their parents died, with her boyfriend Tommy, much to Carolyne's disapproval. Sissy wants to become a professional ice skater, but Carolyne wants Sissy to be a schoolteacher like her.

Their battle continues throughout the movie. Later, their estranged sister Frieda (Cash), who has been living in inner-city Detroit for the last 13 years, shows up with her 12-year-old son Danny (Kristoff St. John). They decide to stay for a while because Danny has had some trouble with the law in Detroit and Frieda wants to give him a fresh start in a new environment. While the Lovejoy sisters try to co-exist in their family house (which their late father left to all three of them), their lives turn upside down. Frieda suggests selling the house since Sissy will be out on her own soon and Carolyne doesn't need all the extra space by herself.

Frieda emerges as the troubled black sheep of the family, while Carolyne is knocked off her martyr pedestal when Frieda seduces the reverend. Sissy learns that their father never wanted another daughter, but had hoped she would be the son that eluded him (their mother tried to abort her). After Frieda and Carolyne get into a vicious catfight, Frieda and Sissy both decide to leave. The movie ends with Sissy leaving for New York and Frieda deciding to stay in North Carolina and work things out with Carolyne.

Production
Although the movie was filmed in February 1979, NBC chose to withhold it until June 1982, when it aired during primetime. According to JET, Fred Silverman, who was the head executive of the network at the time, decided not to air the film because it did not match his preferred formats of "action-packed or comedy shows," and that the film's focus on the intense personal dramas of middle-class blacks would not appeal to white sensibilities of the late 1970s. After Silverman's resignation, the new network president, Grant Tinker, decided to make his mark on NBC's programming by debuting all of the productions that Silverman had shelved.

Though set in North Carolina, Sister, Sister was filmed on location in Montgomery, Alabama and Opelika, Alabama. The historic Old Ship A.M.E. Zion Church in Montgomery was used for the church scenes, and the interior and exterior of the Lovejoy house were filmed at the J.W. Darden House in Opelika.

Awards
The film won the NAACP Image Award for Outstanding Television Movie, Mini-Series or Dramatic Special. Cara won the NAACP Image Award for Outstanding Actress in a Television Movie, Mini-Series or Dramatic Special for her role in the film.

Cast
 Diahann Carroll – Carolyne Lovejoy, the eldest sister, a schoolteacher
 Rosalind Cash – Frieda Lovejoy-Burton, the middle sister
 Irene Cara – Sisina "Sissy" Lovejoy, the youngest sister, an aspiring ice skater
 Paul Winfield – Eddie Craven
 Dick Anthony Williams – Rev. Richard Henderson, Carolyne's pastor
 Kristoff St. John – Daniel "Danny" Burton, Frieda's son (credited as Christopher St. John)
 Robert Hooks – Harry Burton, Frieda's estranged husband, a struggling musician
 Diana Douglas – Pawnshop Proprietor
 Lamont Johnson – Tommy, Sissy's boyfriend who Carolyne dislikes
 Albert Popwell – Drunken Man
 Frances Williams – Mother Bishop
 Alvin Childress – Mister Jacobs
 Gloria Edwards – Mrs. Henderson
 Music Performed by Bobby Jones and the New Life Singers

References

1982 television films
1982 films
Films with screenplays by Maya Angelou
Films directed by John Berry
1982 drama films
American drama television films
20th Century Fox Television films
Films shot in Alabama
Films about sisters
1980s American films
1980s English-language films